Ameyaw Kissi Debrah, known professionally as Ameyaw Debrah, is a Ghanaian celebrity blogger, freelance journalist, and reporter. He founded AmeyawDebrah.com, an entertainment website and blog that primarily publishes news about Ghanaian celebrities. He graduated from Kwame Nkrumah University of Science and Technology with a bachelor's degree in publishing. While at KNUST, he won the Best Publishing Student award in 2005. He has made significant contributions to several pan-African websites, including Jamati.com, Orijin-ent.com, and ModernGhana.com.

In 2008, he joined GhanaWeb.com as the entertainment editor and launched his own website that same year.

Early life and education 
Debrah attended Adisadel College in Cape Coast, and became an editor for the school's magazine in 1999. He graduated with a bachelor's degree in publishing from Kwame Nkrumah University of Science and Technology (KNUST). After graduating from KNUST, Debrah completed his National Service Secretariat (NSS) programme at Ovation International Magazine in Accra.

Career

Early career 
While at Ovation, he primarily wrote about the Ghanaian entertainment industry. His writings were published for the publication's international audience. After completing his service with NSS, he became a columnist for Star newspaper. In 2007, he devoted his time contributing to the pan-African websites Jamati.com, Orijin-ent.com, and ModernGhana.com.

Towards the end of 2007, he joined Voices of Africa, a media project based in the Netherlands. During his time there, he submitted videos, photos and news from Ghana for Africanews.com. In 2008, he became the entertainment editor for GhanaWeb.com. Later that year, he fully launched his blog AmeyawDebrah.com. He left Ghanaweb in 2012 to pursue his blog full-time. He contributes to StarGist, an entertainment segment on Africa Magic, as a Skype correspondent. He also contributes to content on EbonyLife TV and Glitz Africa Magazine. He was an ambassador for Malta Guinness' Africa Rising Campaign.

AmeyawDebrah.com 
The formulation of AmeyawDebrah.com was a result of Debrah's friend hosting and helping him get the domain. Since its inception, the website has found innovative ways to reach readers across the globe. In 2010, the website debuted its iPhone app with the help of MobBase, a web developer. In 2012, the website launched an internet-based talent hunt competition to discover and promote new musical talents in Ghana. In addition, Debrah launched the My Ghana Campaign, a platform that allows readers to record a one-minute video discussing relevant issues in Ghana.

Ringier Ghana and Yen.com.gh  
In December 2014, Debrah joined Ringier Ghana to launch and manage pulse.com.gh. He left in August 2015 to join Genesis Technology and later launched Yen.com.gh.

In September 2015, Debrah worked as the editor-in-chief of a newly established publication called Yen.com.gh. He left the role in September 2017.

Managing career 
Coptic, a multi-platinum award-winning Ghanaian music producer, appointed Debrah as his manager in Ghana and Africa. Coptic released The Black Star Line Mixtape Vol 1 (2011), a mixtape that seeks to bring American rappers back to Africa and close to their roots. The mixtape is also Coptic's introduction to the African market. In addition to managing Coptic's interest in Ghana and Africa, Debrah is also in charge of scouting for new up and coming talents that can be signed to Rebel Musik, Coptic's African music production branch. In an interview posted on Peace FM Online, Debrah said he's grateful for the opportunity to work with Coptic and help advance the careers of other Ghanaian and African artists. Debrah also assumed management of multiple-award-winning rapper Pappy Kojo in 2014.

Ameyaw TV 
In 2018, Debrah launched Ameyaw TV, a web portal for various web video formats. After holding auditions for several talented and young aspiring TV presenters, Ameyaw TV rolled out production of three formats currently streaming on tv.ameyawdebrah.com. The formats include Daily Buzz, News in One, and Trend Mill. Other formats such as Trending GH were later introduced and others are expected to be rolled out in 2019.

Personal life 
Ameyaw Debrah married Elsie Darkoa at a wedding ceremony held on March 6, 2018. The couple have a son named Nathan.

Awards and nominations

References

External links 
 
 Official Website - 

Living people
Ghanaian bloggers
Ghanaian internet celebrities
Gossip columnists
Kwame Nkrumah University of Science and Technology alumni
Ghanaian journalists
Ghanaian publishers (people)
Year of birth missing (living people)
Place of birth missing (living people)